Coleophora tleu is a moth of the family Coleophoridae.

The larvae feed on the generative organs of Anabasis cretacea.

References

tleu
Moths described in 1989